The canton of Orcières is a former administrative division in southeastern France. It was disbanded following the French canton reorganisation which came into effect in March 2015. It consisted of 3 communes, which joined the canton of Saint-Bonnet-en-Champsaur in 2015. It had 1,853 inhabitants (2012).

The canton comprised the following communes:
Champoléon
Orcières
Saint-Jean-Saint-Nicolas

Demographics

See also
Cantons of the Hautes-Alpes department

References

Former cantons of Hautes-Alpes
2015 disestablishments in France
States and territories disestablished in 2015